Henry Lowther Clarke (23 November 1850 – 23 June 1926) was the fourth Anglican bishop and first archbishop of Melbourne, Australia.

Early life 

Clarke was born at Firbank Vicarage, Westmorland, England, the son of the Revd William Clarke and his wife Sarah, née Lowther. He was educated at home and at Sedbergh School, winning a scholarship which took him to St John's College, Cambridge, graduated BA in 1874 as seventh wrangler and MA in 1877.

Clarke was ordained deacon in 1874 and priest in 1875 by William Thomson, the Archbishop of York. He was curate of St John's Kingston-on-Hull from 1874 to 1876 before various positions in the north of England during the next 26 years. He was vicar of Hedon from 1876 to 1883, then assistant master at St. Peter's school in York for a year from 1883 to 1884, when he became vicar of St. Martin, Coney-street, York. In 1890 he became vicar of Dewsbury, and in 1901 vicar of Huddersfield. He was an honorary canon of Wakefield Cathedral from 1893, and proctor for the clergy of the Wakefield diocese in the Convocation of York in 1902.

Melbourne 

Clarke was approached for nomination as Bishop of Melbourne and announced his acceptance of this in early September 1902. The following month he received the degree Doctor of Divinity (DD) from the University of Cambridge. He was consecrated Bishop by the Archbishop of Canterbury in St Paul's Cathedral, London, on 1 November 1902, and arrived in Melbourne in February 1903. Since the resignation of Bishop Goe the area of the Diocese of Melbourne had been greatly reduced by the formation of new dioceses based in Bendigo, Wangaratta and Gippsland. When Clarke began his ministry he appointed a commission to document the present position and future needs of the diocese and later came to the conclusion that certain parishes had become too large and needed subdividing, that means must be found for a more complete training of the clergy, and that there must be an extension of secondary education by means of church schools. In 1905 Clarke became first Archbishop of Melbourne and Metropolitan of Victoria. He ruled his diocese firmly and refused to allow himself to be allied to any party. Recognising that what may be called the puritanical and the aesthetic types of mind are permanent in human nature, he felt that the safest approach would be found in a middle course, and that no good would be done by straining for uniformity in minor issues. In practice, however, Clarke generally opposed evangelicals, as exemplified by the forced resignation of C. H. Nash.

The question of the reunion of the churches was given some consideration, but little progress was made. There was, however, much expansion in the social work of the church, and several successful secondary schools were established, including the Melbourne Church of England Girls' Grammar School, Trinity Grammar School in Kew and Firbank Grammar School in Brighton which Clarke named after his birth place. In 1910 Clarke persuaded the Parliament of Victoria to establish the Melbourne College of Divinity to examine for and grant degrees. In March 1920 Clarke went to London to attend the Lambeth Conference and in November resigned as Archbishop of Melbourne.

Later life 

Clarke lived in retirement in Lymington, Hampshire, and kept himself busy with literary work. His published writings include History of the Parish of Dewsbury (1899), Addresses delivered in England and Australia (1904), The Last Things (1910), Studies in the English Reformation (1912), Addresses delivered to the Synod of the Diocese of Melbourne (1914), The Constitutions of the General Provincial and Diocesan Synods of the Church of England in Australia (1918), Constitutional Church Government in the Dominions Beyond the Seas (1924), an authoritative and comprehensive work; Death and the Hereafter (1926) and, with W. N. Weech, History of Sedbergh School (1925). Clarke died on 23 June 1926. He was given the honorary degree of Doctor of Divinity (DD) by both Cambridge and Oxford universities.

Family 
Clarke married  in 1876 Alice Lovell, daughter of the Revd Canon Kemp. She died suddenly in 1918.  Two sons and a daughter survived him when he died in 1926.

Notes

References

External links 
 

Anglican bishops of Melbourne
Anglican archbishops of Melbourne
20th-century Anglican archbishops
Religious leaders from Melbourne
1850 births
1926 deaths
Alumni of St John's College, Cambridge